The 2012 Empire Trnava Cup was a professional tennis tournament played on outdoor clay courts. It was the fourth edition of the tournament which was part of the 2012 ITF Women's Circuit. It took place in Trnava, Slovakia, on 28 July – 5 August 2012.

WTA entrants

Seeds 

 1 Rankings as of 23 July 2012

Other entrants 
The following players received wildcards into the singles main draw:
  Michaela Frlicka
  Laura Gulbe
  Gabriela Pantůčková
  Nikola Vajdová

The following players received entry from the qualifying draw:
  Martina Borecká
  Iris Khanna
  Hilda Melander
  Ana Savić

Champions

Singles 

  Anastasija Sevastova def.  Ana Savić (walkover)

Doubles 

  Elena Bogdan /  Renata Voráčová def.  Marta Domachowska /  Sandra Klemenschits 7–6(7–2), 6–4

External links 
 
 2012 Empire Trnava Cup at ITFtennis.com

Empire Trnava Cup
Tennis tournaments in Slovakia
Clay court tennis tournaments
2012 in Slovak tennis